Keith Christopher Ingham (born 5 February 1942) is an English jazz pianist, mainly active in swing and Dixieland revival.

Early life and education
Ingham was born in London on 5 February 1942. His father played the organ in churches. Ingham was largely self-taught and started playing the piano at the age of ten. "He first played in nightclubs in 1960–62 while on government service in Hong Kong, monitoring Chinese airfields during the Cold War, and then read languages, specializing in classical Chinese, at Oxford University."  He was married to jazz singer Susannah McCorkle.

Later life and career
His first professional gigs occurred in 1964. He played with Sandy Brown, Bruce Turner, and Wally Fawkes over the next decade. He played with Bob Wilber and Bud Freeman in 1974, and moved to New York City in 1978. In the 1980s he played with Benny Goodman, the World's Greatest Jazz Band, and Susannah McCorkle. He also worked with Maxine Sullivan, Marty Grosz, and Harry Allen. He recorded several albums of 1930s songs for Jump Records. He has led several bands, including the New York Nine and the Hot Cosmopolites.

Discography

External links

References

1942 births
Living people
Musicians from London
English jazz pianists
21st-century pianists
World's Greatest Jazz Band members
Sackville Records artists
Island Records artists
Challenge Records (1994) artists
Stomp Off artists
Arbors Records artists